The 2011–12 Hong Kong FA Cup was the 38th season of Hong Kong FA Cup. It is a knockout competition for all the teams of the 2011–12 Hong Kong First Division League.

Originally, Brain Leung, chairman of Hong Kong Football Association, announced the winner of the FA Cup would be qualified to 2012 Chinese FA Cup after both the invitation of Chinese Football Association and the voting result of board meeting. However, the calendar of Chinese FA Cup had been announced before the board meeting and therefore the plan was abolished.

Kitchee clinch their first Hong Kong FA Cup title and completed The Treble.

Calendar

Draw

Bracket

Match Records

First round

Quarter-finals

Semi-finals

Final

MATCH OFFICIALS
Assistant referees:
Chan Shui Hung
Ho Wai Sing
Fourth official: Charlton Wong Chi Tang

MATCH RULES
90 minutes.
30 minutes of extra-time if necessary.
Penalty shoot-out if scores still level.
Seven named substitutes
Maximum of 3 substitutions.

Scorers
The scorers in the 2011–12 Hong Kong FA Cup are as follows:

5 goals

 Leandro Carrijo (TSW Pegasus)

2 goals

 Alex Tayo Akande (Hong Kong Sapling)
 Makhosonke Bhengu (Tuen Mun)
 Itaparica (TSW Pegasus)
 Jaimes Mckee (TSW Pegasus)
 Chan Man Fai (Kitchee)
 Roberto Losada (Kitchee)

1 goal

 Ling Cong (Tuen Mun)
 Godfred Karikari (TSW Pegasus)
 Cheung Kin Fung (TSW Pegasus)
 Lau Cheuk Hin (Sham Shui Po)
 Lo Kong Wai (Sham Shui Po)
 Dean Evans (Sham Shui Po)
 Huang Yang (Kitchee)
 Lo Kwan Yee (Kitchee)
 Liang Zicheng (Kitchee)
 Yago Gonzalez (Kitchee)
 Andreu Ramos Isus (Hong Kong Sapling)
 Cheung Kwok Ming (Hong Kong Sapling)
 Giovane (South China)
 Joel (South China)
 Lam Hok Hei (Biu Chun Rangers)
 Li Jian (Biu Chun Rangers)
 To Hon To (Wofoo Tai Po)

References

External links
FA Cup - Hong Kong Football Association

Fa Cup
Hong Kong Fa Cup
2012